The Mark of Zorro is a 1974 American Western television film which stars Frank Langella alongside Gilbert Roland, Yvonne De Carlo, Anne Archer, Ricardo Montalbán and Robert Middleton.

It was also a backdoor pilot for a television series on which ABC-TV declined to pick up the option. The film used Alfred Newman's musical score for the 1940 film version along with new incidental music composed by Dominic Frontiere.

Plot
After receiving a letter from his father (Roland) requesting his immediate return home, Don Diego de la Vega (Langella) resigns his commission as a cadet and sails from Spain to California. Arriving in the Pueblo of Los Angeles, he learns that his father has been replaced as Alcalde by Don Luis Quintero (Middleton). Quintero is a puppet of the witty and urbane swordsman, Captain Esteban (Montalbán), and the once-free populace are oppressed by high taxes and cruel laws. Beatings and imprisonment are common for minor infractions.

Diego immediately takes on the persona of a fop to appear ineffectual to the Alcalde and Esteban. His father perceives him as weak and useless, a sacrifice Diego is willing to endure to achieve his goal. Determined to restore freedom, Diego secretly takes one of a pair of ancestral swords and adopts the disguise of the legendary masked hero, El Zorro. His terror campaign against the Alcalde and the Captain eventually rouses the people against them. In his role as the fop, he romances the Alcalde's beautiful niece, Teresa (Archer), whom he grows to love. He simultaneously flirts with the Alcalde's wife, Inez (Sorel), to gain information and make her lover, Esteban, jealous.

Zorro's old teacher, Frey Felipe, is accused of being Zorro and arrested. Diego effects a rescue, while his father leads the peons and caballeros and marches on the Alcalde's palace. As Zorro forces the Alcalde to sign a letter of resignation, Esteban appears and forces a duel to the death. Esteban is startled when Diego reveals his identity, lowering his guard for Diego's killing blow.

The rebels storm the palace. Zorro shows the Alcalde's resignation to the crowd outside. Alejandro announces that Zorro's "stolen" sword "has never seen such distinction". "Zorro" thanks him and reveals his identity before the crowd. Don Luis and his wife return to Spain in dishonor.

Main cast

Production
Langella said, "I think Bryan Taggart's script... is marvellous. We have a great cast... A good director... I loved doing it. Here was a chance to play on three levels: the young cadet in Spain, the fop Don Diego - and, in his mask, Zorro. I was really playing out my fantasies. I was reliving myself as a small boy sitting in the dark theatre thrilling to Tyrone Power riding through the night as Zorro."

Reception
The Chicago Tribune called it "truly terrific trash you can sink your teeth into". The Los Angeles Times said it was done "in the spirit of good, though occasionally uneasy fun".

References

External links

 
 

1974 television films
1974 Western (genre) films
American Western (genre) television films
Zorro films
ABC Movie of the Week
Television pilots not picked up as a series
Television films as pilots
Films set in the 1840s
Films set in California
20th Century Fox Television films
Films based on works by Johnston McCulley
1970s English-language films